Shuangqiao may refer to the following locations in China:

Towns
Shuangqiao, Guangxi, a town in Wuming County, Nanning, Guangxi
Shuangqiao, Tangshan, in Kaiping District, Tangshan, Hebei
Shuangqiao, Qidong, in Qidong County
Shuangqiao, Jiangxi, in Wanzai County, Jiangxi
Shuangqiao, Shandong, a village in Yuncheng County, Shadong
Shuangqiao, Zhoushan, a town in Qujiang District, Zhejiang

Townships
Shuangqiao Township, Henan, a township in Yongcheng District, Henan
Shuangqiao Subdistrict, Yangzhou, in Hanjiang District, Yangzhou
Shuangqiao Township, Jiangxi, in Suichuan County, Jiangxi
Shuangqiao Township, Zhejiang, in Qujiang District, Quzhou, Zhejiang

Districts
Shuangqiao District, Chengde, Hebei
Shuangqiao District, Chongqing
Shuangqiao Subdistrict, a subdistrict in Xuanzhou District, Xuancheng, Anhui
Shuangqiao Subdistrict, Yangzhou, in Hanjiang District, Yangzhou, Jiangsu

See also
Shuangqiao station (disambiguation)